Aziz Mushabber Ahmadi (25 March 1932 – 2 March 2023) was an Indian judge who was the 26th chief justice of India. After serving as a judge in the Gujarat High Court, Ahmadi was appointed judge to the Supreme Court in 1988. He was then elevated to the post of chief justice, and served from 1994 to 1997. He served as chancellor at the Aligarh Muslim University for two terms.

Judicial career
Having received Bachelor of Laws (LL.B.), Ahmadi joined the bar in 1954. He eventually was appointed judge to the City Civil & Sessions Court of Ahmedabad in 1964. During this time, Ahmadi was appointed secretary of the legal affairs of the state of Gujarat in 1974, which soon led to an appointment as judge of the Gujarat High Court in 1976.

As judge of the Gujarat High Court, Ahmadi worked as chairman of various advisory boards for: 
Conservation of Foreign Exchange and Prevention of Smuggling Activities
Prevention of Black Marketing
Maintenance of Supplies of Essential Commodities.

Also, he worked as a member of the Ravi & Beas Waters Disputes Tribunal under the Rajiv-Longowal Settlement (Punjab Settlement).

Ultimately this led to an appointment as a justice in the Supreme Court of India in December 1988. After six years, Ahmadi was appointed chief justice of India in October 1994. Ahmadi became the third Muslim ever to serve as chief justice of India. After serving for two and a half years, he eventually stepped down to retire in March 1997.

Foreign recognition
Among many recognitions include:
Member of the American Inns of Court (May 1995)
Honorary Master Bencher of the Honourable Society of Middle Temple, London (November 1996)
Degree of Doctor of Laws (Honoris Causa) conferred by University of Leicester, England. (July 1998)
Nominated on International Committees:
Human Rights violation in East Timor (United Nations)
To assist the judiciary in Liberia (International Court of Justice)
To review the state of relations between the judiciary, the legal profession, and the executive and violation of human rights in Zimbabwe (International Bar Association)

Post-Retirement Career

Chancellor at Aligarh
After stepping down from the supreme court, Ahmadi became chancellor of Aligarh Muslim University. In 2007, Ahmadi was re-elected chancellor of Aligarh for three years.

After entering academia, he was invited to speak at various universities and forums worldwide. Particularly in India, he used his status to speak out on political issues such as minority rights.

Muslim Rights
Using his status, Ahmadi also continued to speak out for Muslim rights in India, himself being a Muslim. He remained active in Indian politics as an advocate of minority rights, latterly through a book entitled A Guide To Uplift Minorities by the city-based Human Welfare Trust .

Putting emphasis on education, Ahmadi frequently mentioned that the vast Muslim population of India struggled to put children in school. He encouraged federal and state governments to solve this problem, stating that, "the country simply cannot afford to have a certain percentage of population unable to contribute to the country's development."

Arbitrations
Ahmadi was a sought-after arbitrator in high-value domestic as well as international arbitration matters.

Death
Ahmadi died on 2 March 2023, at the age of 91.

References
Indian Supreme Court – Justice Background: A.M. Ahmadi

External links
Muslims haven’t availed of constitutional rights: justice Ahmadi
Book review: A guide to uplift minorities

1932 births
2023 deaths
People from Surat
20th-century Indian Muslims
21st-century Indian Muslims
20th-century Indian judges
Chief justices of India
Judges of the Gujarat High Court